Oak Bay was a provincial electoral district in the Canadian province of British Columbia. It first appeared in the general election of 1941 and last appeared in the 1975 election. Its successor is the Oak Bay-Gordon Head riding. For other ridings in the area of Victoria, B.C. please see Victoria (electoral districts).

Demographics

Political Geography

Notable Elections

Notable MLAs
Several British Columbia Conservative Party leaders have represented the riding including Herbert Anscomb who was Minister of Finance and Deputy Premier in the Liberal-Conservative coalition government. George Scott Wallace represented the district in the 1970s and his successor as Tory leader Victor Albert Stephens was its last MLA from 1978 until 1979.

Electoral history
Note: Winners in each election are shown in bold.

|-

|Liberal
|Everett Stanley Farr
|align="right"|1,520
|align="right"|31.74%
|align="right"|
|align="right"|unknown

|Co-operative Commonwealth Fed.
|Geoffrey LeGallais
|align="right"|593
|align="right"|12.38%
|align="right"|
|align="right"|unknown
|- bgcolor="white"
!align="right" colspan=3|Total valid votes
!align="right"|4,789
!align="right"|100.00%
!align="right"|
|- bgcolor="white"
!align="right" colspan=3|Total rejected ballots
!align="right"|68
!align="right"|
!align="right"|
|- bgcolor="white"
!align="right" colspan=3|Turnout
!align="right"|%
!align="right"|
!align="right"|
|}

|-

|Co-operative Commonwealth Fed.
|Clare Nulalinda McAllister
|align="right"|988
|align="right"|17.69%
|align="right"|
|align="right"|unknown
|- bgcolor="white"
!align="right" colspan=3|Total valid votes
!align="right"|5,586
!align="right"|100.00%
!align="right"|
|- bgcolor="white"
!align="right" colspan=3|Total rejected ballots
!align="right"|40
!align="right"|
!align="right"|
|- bgcolor="white"
!align="right" colspan=3|Turnout
!align="right"|%
!align="right"|
!align="right"|
|}

|-

|Co-operative Commonwealth
|Patricia Mary Luchinsky
|align="right"|890
|align="right"|12.66%
|align="right"|
|align="right"|unknown

|- bgcolor="white"
!align="right" colspan=3|Total valid votes
!align="right"|7,028
!align="right"|100.00%
!align="right"|
|- bgcolor="white"
!align="right" colspan=3|Total rejected ballots
!align="right"|183
!align="right"|
!align="right"|
|- bgcolor="white"
!align="right" colspan=3|Turnout
!align="right"|%
!align="right"|
!align="right"|
|}

|-

|Progressive Conservative
|Herbert Anscomb
|align="right"|2,843
|align="right"|34.45%
|align="right"|3,282
|align="right"|43.24%
|align="right"|
|align="right"|unknown

|Co-operative Commonwealth Fed.
|Frederick James Bevis
|align="right"|707
|align="right"|8.57%
|align="right"| -
|align="right"| - %
|align="right"|
|align="right"|unknown

|Liberal
|Philip Archibald Gibbs
|align="right"|3,631
|align="right"|44.00%
|align="right"|4,308
|align="right"|56.76%
|align="right"|
|align="right"|unknown
|- bgcolor="white"
!align="right" colspan=3|Total valid votes
!align="right"|8,252
!align="right"|%
!align="right"|7,590
!align="right"|100.00%
!align="right"|
|- bgcolor="white"
!align="right" colspan=3|Total rejected ballots
!align="right"|130
!align="right"|
!align="right"|
|- bgcolor="white"
!align="right" colspan=3|Turnout
!align="right"|%
!align="right"|
!align="right"|
|- bgcolor="white"
!align="right" colspan=9|1 Preferential ballot; 1st and final counts (of three) shown only.
|}

|-

|Co-operative Commonwealth Fed.
|Frederick James Bevis
|align="right"|508
|align="right"|6.20%
|align="right"| -
|align="right"| - %
|align="right"|
|align="right"|unknown

|Progressive Conservative
|Douglas Deane Finlayson
|align="right"|1,220
|align="right"|14.90%
|align="right"| -
|align="right"| - %
|align="right"|
|align="right"|unknown

|Liberal
|Philip Archibald Gibbs
|align="right"|3,182
|align="right"|38.85%
|align="right"|4,110
|align="right"|52.75%
|align="right"|
|align="right"|unknown

|- bgcolor="white"
!align="right" colspan=3|Total valid votes
!align="right"|8,190
!align="right"|100.00%
!align="right"|7,791
!align="right"|%
!align="right"|
|- bgcolor="white"
!align="right" colspan=3|Total rejected ballots
!align="right"|192
!align="right"|
!align="right"|
!align="right"|
!align="right"|
|- bgcolor="white"
!align="right" colspan=3|Total Registered Voters
!align="right"|
!align="right"|
!align="right"|
!align="right"|
!align="right"|
|- bgcolor="white"
!align="right" colspan=3|Turnout
!align="right"|%
!align="right"|
!align="right"|
!align="right"|
!align="right"|
|- bgcolor="white"
!align="right" colspan=9|2 Preferential ballot; 1st and final counts (of three) shown only.
|}

|-

|Liberal
|Philip Archibald Gibbs
|align="right"|3,940
|align="right"|49.38%
|align="right"|
|align="right"|unknown

|Progressive Conservative
|Justin Victor Harbord
|align="right"|919
|align="right"|11.52%
|align="right"|
|align="right"|unknown

|Co-operative Commonwealth Fed.
|Patrick Holman Thomas
|align="right"|429
|align="right"|5.38%
|align="right"|
|align="right"|unknown
|- bgcolor="white"
!align="right" colspan=3|Total valid votes
!align="right"|7,979
!align="right"|100.00%
!align="right"|
|- bgcolor="white"
!align="right" colspan=3|Total rejected ballots
!align="right"|74
!align="right"|
!align="right"|
|- bgcolor="white"
!align="right" colspan=3|Turnout
!align="right"|%
!align="right"|
!align="right"|
|}

|-

|Progressive Conservative
|James Arthur Anderson
|align="right"|1,212
|align="right"|11.82%
|align="right"|
|align="right"|unknown

|Liberal
|Alan Brock MacFarlane
|align="right"|4,558
|align="right"|44.46%
|align="right"|
|align="right"|unknown

|Co-operative Commonwealth Fed.
|Francis Harris Mitchell
|align="right"|701
|align="right"|6.84%
|align="right"|
|align="right"|unknown

|- bgcolor="white"
!align="right" colspan=3|Total valid votes
!align="right"|10,251
!align="right"|100.00%
!align="right"|
|- bgcolor="white"
!align="right" colspan=3|Total rejected ballots
!align="right"|113
!align="right"|
!align="right"|
|- bgcolor="white"
!align="right" colspan=3|Turnout
!align="right"|%
!align="right"|
!align="right"|
|}

|-

|Progressive Conservative
|Hugh Larratt Henderson
|align="right"|1,726
|align="right"|16.56%
|align="right"|
|align="right"|unknown

|Liberal
|Alan Brock MacFarlane
|align="right"|4,457
|align="right"|42.77%
|align="right"|
|align="right"|unknown
|- bgcolor="white"
!align="right" colspan=3|Total valid votes
!align="right"|10,422
!align="right"|100.00%
!align="right"|
|- bgcolor="white"
!align="right" colspan=3|Total rejected ballots
!align="right"|72
!align="right"|
!align="right"|
|- bgcolor="white"
!align="right" colspan=3|Turnout
!align="right"|%
!align="right"|
!align="right"|
|}

|-

|Liberal
|Alan Brock MacFarlane
|align="right"|8,118
|align="right"|54.48%
|align="right"|
|align="right"|unknown

|- bgcolor="white"
!align="right" colspan=3|Total valid votes
!align="right"|14,902
!align="right"|100.00%
!align="right"|
|- bgcolor="white"
!align="right" colspan=3|Total rejected ballots
!align="right"|184
!align="right"|
!align="right"|
|- bgcolor="white"
!align="right" colspan=3|Turnout
!align="right"|%
!align="right"|
!align="right"|
|}

|-

|Liberal
|Allan Leslie Cox
|align="right"|6,656
|align="right"|36.37%
|align="right"|
|align="right"|unknown

|- bgcolor="white"
!align="right" colspan=3|Total valid votes
!align="right"|18,303
!align="right"|100.00%
!align="right"|
|- bgcolor="white"
!align="right" colspan=3|Total rejected ballots
!align="right"|174
!align="right"|
!align="right"|
|- bgcolor="white"
!align="right" colspan=3|Turnout
!align="right"|%
!align="right"|
!align="right"|
|}

|-

|Liberal
|Mel Couvelier
|align="right"|3,253
|align="right"|16.47%
|align="right"|
|align="right"|unknown

|George Scott Wallace
|align="right"|10,319
|align="right"|52.06%
|align="right"|
|align="right"|unknown
|- bgcolor="white"
!align="right" colspan=3|Total valid votes
!align="right"|19,747
!align="right"|100.00%
!align="right"|
|- bgcolor="white"
!align="right" colspan=3|Total rejected ballots
!align="right"|229
!align="right"|
!align="right"|
|- bgcolor="white"
!align="right" colspan=3|Turnout
!align="right"|%
!align="right"|
!align="right"|
|}

|-

|George Scott Wallace
|align="right"|11,489
|align="right"|51.78%
|align="right"|
|align="right"|unknown
|- bgcolor="white"
!align="right" colspan=3|Total valid votes
!align="right"|22,189
!align="right"|100.00%
!align="right"|
|- bgcolor="white"
!align="right" colspan=3|Total rejected ballots
!align="right"|229
!align="right"|
!align="right"|
|- bgcolor="white"
!align="right" colspan=3|Turnout
!align="right"|%
!align="right"|
!align="right"|
|}

|-

|Victor Albert Stephens
|align="right"|6,904
|align="right"|38.54%
|align="right"|
|align="right"|unknown

|- bgcolor="white"
!align="right" colspan=3|Total valid votes
!align="right"|17,915
!align="right"|100.00%
!align="right"|
|- bgcolor="white"
!align="right" colspan=3|Total rejected ballots
!align="right"|154
!align="right"|
!align="right"|
|- bgcolor="white"
!align="right" colspan=3|Turnout
!align="right"|%
!align="right"|
!align="right"|
|}
The Oak Bay riding was redistributed and the new riding of Oak Bay-Gordon Head created. It first appeared in the general election of 1979.

Sources
Elections BC Historical Returns

Former provincial electoral districts of British Columbia on Vancouver Island